Trave-Land is an Amt ("collective municipality") in the district of Segeberg, in Schleswig-Holstein, Germany.

Geography
It is situated around Bad Segeberg, which is the seat of the Amt, but not part of it. It is named after the river Trave, which flows through the Amt.

Subdivision
The Amt Trave-Land consists of the following municipalities:

 Bahrenhof
 Blunk
 Bühnsdorf
 Dreggers
 Fahrenkrug
 Geschendorf
 Glasau
 Groß Rönnau
 Klein Gladebrügge
 Klein Rönnau
 Krems II
 Negernbötel
 Nehms
 Neuengörs
 Pronstorf
 Rohlstorf
 Schackendorf
 Schieren
 Seedorf
 Stipsdorf
 Strukdorf
 Travenhorst
 Traventhal
 Wakendorf I
 Weede
 Wensin
 Westerrade

See also
Trave
Berlin (Seedorf)
Holstein Switzerland

References

Statistikamt Nord: Bevölkerung der Gemeinden in Schleswig-Holstein am 31. Dezember 2008 (PDF-Datei; 539 kB)

External links
 Trave-Land official website

Ämter in Schleswig-Holstein